Hubei University of Technology (HBUT) specializing in engineering, was founded in 1952, located in Hugong Residential Community, Shizishan, Hongshan, Wuhan, Hubei, China. It is a public key multi-discipline university of Hubei Province.

College of Biological, Chemical and Resources Engineering
School of Civil Engineering and Architecture 
School of Mechanical Engineering
School of Arts and Design
School of Electrical and Electronic Engineering
School of Computer Science
School of Management
School of Economics and Politics
School of Foreign Languages and Literature
School of Science

Academic performance
In Nature Index 2015 Asia-Pacific, which tracks author contributions to scientific articles, HBUT was ranked 8 in the top 500 Asia Pacific region for Physical Sciences.

References

External links
 

Universities and colleges in Hebei
Technical universities and colleges in China